James or Jim Forbes may refer to:

Politicians
 James Alexander Forbes (1805–1881), British vice-consul to Mexican California and founder of the town of Los Gatos
 James Forbes (statesman) (c. 1731–1780), U.S. statesman, Continental Congressman for Maryland
 James Fraser Forbes (1820–1887), Canadian Member of Parliament
 James Randy Forbes (born 1952), U.S. Representative from Virginia
 Jim Forbes (Australian politician) (1923–2019), former Australian politician

Sportspeople
 James Forbes (basketball) (1952–2022), U.S. basketball player, Olympic silver medalist
 Jim C. Forbes (1908–1981), Australian rules footballer for St Kilda
 Jim Forbes (footballer) (1908–1996), Australian rules footballer for South Melbourne

Military
 James Forbes (hospital inspector) (1779–1837), Scottish inspector-general of army hospitals
 James Forbes, 17th Lord Forbes (1765–1843), Scottish colonel
 James Forbes-Robertson (1884–1955), English recipient of the Victoria Cross for his service in World War I

Religion
 James Forbes (divine) (c. 1629–1712), Scottish nonconformist minister
 James Forbes (minister) (1813–1851), Australian clergyman and educator
 James A. Forbes (born 1935), Senior Minister of New York's Riverside Church

Others
 James Forbes, 16th Lord Forbes (died 1804), Scottish nobleman
 James Forbes (artist) (1749–1819), British artist 
 James Forbes (botanist) (1773–1861), British gardener and botanist
 James Forbes (portrait painter) (1797–1881), Scottish-American portrait painter
 James David Forbes (1809–1868), Scottish physicist
 James Staats Forbes (1823–1904), Scottish railway engineer, railway administrator and art collector
 James Forbes (playwright) (1871–1938), Canadian-American writer
 James Forbes (storekeeper) (1828–1906), early Western Australian settler
 Jim Forbes (journalist) (born 1955), American writer, producer and correspondent